"One Shot" is a song by English boy band JLS. It was written by Soulshock & Karlin, Michael Warren, Brandon White, and Sean Hurley. It was released on 21 February 2010 as their third and final single from their self-titled debut album (2009). The song reached the A-List on BBC Radio 1's playlist, and reached number six in the United Kingdom, where it has so far sold 302,493 copies.

Critical reception
Digital Spy awarded the song 3 stars and said: "It's essentially a classic boyband ballad given some trendy, rave-tinged production - lyrics to please Louis Walsh, synth sounds to satisfy the Kiss FM playlist team. Decent enough then, but as with most of their album, it does make you wonder how far JLS might go with some really good tunes?"

Fraser McAlpine of BBC Chart blog gave the song a positive review stating "You've got to love a song with two tempos. I mean most songs have just the one. They begin, tick away the minutes, sometimes stopping, sometimes starting up again, but they really don't ever tend to deviate from their one central pulse. But this has got TWO. TWO! The opening verse is wafty and slow, Aston calmly explaining that he's got his eye on a special someone and he's trying to screw his courage up into a little ball so that he can go and ask her out. Then there's some ravey synth action, which is whizzy and fast and we're into the chorus, which is - and this is where the genius lies - BOTH OF THESE THINGS AT THE SAME TIME!"

Promotion
On 17 December 2009, JLS performed the song on Alan Carr: Chatty Man, as well as So You Think You Can Dance on 23 January 2010. They performed the track on 10 February, on GMTV with Lorraine, before giving an interview. The single was also performed at Let's Dance for Sport Relief, The Album Chart Show, and The National Lottery Draws.

Music video
The music video premiered on 16 January 2010.

Track listing
 CD1 (88697634512)
 "One Shot" (Radio Version #1) – 3:38
 "Mary" – 3:05

 CD2 (88697658892)
 "One Shot" (Radio Version #2) – 3:18
 "One Shot" (Kardinal Beats Radio Edit) – 3.42
 "One Shot" (Kardinal Beats Remix feat. Mr Damz) – 3.55
 "One Shot" (Bimbo Jones Remix) – 6.49
 "One Shot" (Nu Addiction Remix) – 7:17

Charts

Weekly charts

Year-end charts

Certifications

Release history

References

External links

2009 songs
Songs written by Soulshock
Song recordings produced by Soulshock and Karlin
JLS songs
Contemporary R&B ballads
Songs written by Sean Hurley (songwriter)
2010 singles
Songs written by Kenneth Karlin